Seltzer is carbonated water.
 Hard seltzer, alcoholic drink

Seltzer may also refer to:

 Seltzer (surname)
 Seltzer, Pennsylvania, a census-designated place in Schuylkill County, Pennsylvania, United States

See also 
 Alka-Seltzer
 Bromo-Seltzer
 Selters (Lahn), a village in Germany known for its natural mineral springs
 Seltzer bottle
 Selzer
 Setzer